Alessandro Argoli (1594–1654) was a Roman Catholic prelate who served as Bishop of Veroli (1651–1654).

Biography
Alessandro Argoli was born in Avezzano, Italy on 4 September 1594 and ordained a priest in May 1650.
On 28 October 1651, he was appointed during the papacy of Pope Innocent X as Bishop of Veroli.
On 5 November 1651, he was consecrated bishop by Marcantonio Franciotti, Cardinal-Priest of Santa Maria della Pace, with Giambattista Spada, Titular Patriarch of Constantinople, and Girolamo Buonvisi, Titular Archbishop of Laodicea in Phrygia, serving as co-consecrators. 
He served as Bishop of Veroli until his death on 26 April 1654.

References

External links and additional sources
 (for Chronology of Bishops) 
 (for Chronology of Bishops) 

17th-century Italian Roman Catholic bishops
Bishops appointed by Pope Innocent X
1594 births
1654 deaths